Goran Kreso (born 28 March 1994) is an Austrian footballer who plays for ASK Ebreichsdorf.

External links

 

Austrian footballers
1994 births
Living people
FC Liefering players
SV Horn players
Floridsdorfer AC players
Association football defenders
2. Liga (Austria) players